Elaphe is a genus of snakes in the family Colubridae. Elaphe is one of the main genera of the rat snakes, which are found in many regions of the northern hemisphere. Elaphe species are medium to large constrictors by nature. Although all of the species in Elaphe are nonvenomous, bites from rat snakes are still irritably painful and can potentially cause bacterial infections, especially due to the saliva.

Based on the mitochondrial DNA analysis results, many species of Elaphe have been moved to the genera Bogertophis, Coelognathus, Gonyosoma, Orthriophis, Pantherophis, Rhinechis, Senticolis, Zamenis, and others.
Nevertheless, the generic name Elaphe is still widely used.

Physical characteristics
Like most of the rat snakes, Elaphe spp. generally have slender but sturdy bodies, square heads, and extremely flat bellies.
Their sizes range from large medium to very large, growing even as large as 108 in. Elaphe spp. have large numbers of vertebrae, ribs, and ventral scales, but few rows of dorsal scales, which are characterized by having slight keels. In cross section, Elaphe spp. are shaped like a loaf of bread, the flat belly meeting the sides of the body at an angle. This special physical characteristic is well observed in Elaphe obsoleta (now considered Pantherophis obsoletus), whose belly scales curve upward. The curving of the ventral scales gives them better traction for tree climbing. The color and pattern of Elaphe spp. are quite variable and hard to generalize.

Internally, Elaphe spp. do not have any observable vestiges of hind limbs or coronoid bones of the lower jaw like any other members of the family Colubridae. Another important characteristic of Elaphe as part of the Colubridae is the presence of Duvernoy's gland, a modified salivary and digestive gland.
In addition, Elaphe spp. have equal and smooth maxillary teeth. The teeth are small and slightly curved, and occur in several rows. The curved teeth help fix the prey and prevent them from escaping once they are caught.

Senses
Elaphe spp. have very developed sensory organs which support their daily activities. They have  internal ears that enables them to detect sounds at low frequencies. The ears consist of a single ear bone connected to a jaw bone. Compared to other snakes, they are considered to have highly developed vision that allows them to detect the movement of their predators and prey. The eyes are protected by single transparent brilles. In addition, the analysis of scents is carried out by Jacobson's organ in the palate. To stimulate Jacobson's organ, they use their tongues to transport air and ground molecules to Jacobson's organ. Then, the organ analyzes the molecules to identify the scent. Among these detectable scents are pheromones, which indicate the presence of other snakes and their reproductive readiness.

Lifecycle and behavior
The lifespan of Elaphe spp. is generally 15 years. Males live a little longer than females,
but some species, such as E. guttata (now considered Pantherophis guttata),  live up to 23 years in captivity.
However, species such as E. emoryi (now considered Pantherophis emoryi) usually have lifespans around 2 years and 2 months.

Elaphe spp. generally reach sexual maturity after 18–24 months. They usually mate with the opposite sex after emerging from hibernation in the spring. The gestation period of females is around 1.5 months, and females can lay up to 30 eggs in a clutch, the number varying between species.  E. guttata and E. obsoleta, among others,  are mostly diurnal, but some species are more active in late afternoon or at dusk. Throughout the year, they are usually active from April to October, followed by a period of hibernation.

Hibernation
Elaphe spp.  hibernate, especially those that live in cold regions, because snakes are cold-blooded, which makes their body temperature susceptible to the temperature of their environments. Thus, they need to maintain their body energy by switching locations and remaining physiologically inactive when winter comes. The hibernacula sites vary depending on the habitats they live in, yet the most important requirement of a hibernaculum site is that it needs to be frost-free. Some Elaphe spp. hibernate in the rock crevices, rock faults, and burrows.
However, other species choose to hibernate in rotting logs, roots of trees, and hollow spaces in elevated tree trunks. Some snakes that live close to human communities even hibernate in old wells and barns.

Most members of the genus Elaphe start their hibernation in October and emerge again the next spring. The length of the hibernation varies by species. Elaphe longissima, or Aesculapian snake, may hibernate  from October to  May, as it is among the northernmost occurring rat snakes. However, Elaphe bimaculata, or the twin-spotted rat snake, only needs to hibernate for 2 to 3 months. Species such as black rat snakes, or E. obsoleta, hibernate with other rat snakes and/or many other snake species, most notably timber rattlesnakes, racers, and bull snakes.

Reproduction
E. obsoleta generally starts to mate in late April, May, and early June after the winter hibernation.  Males try to attract females with pheromones, as the females pass through their territories. Male Aesculapian snakes pursue female snakes until they can coil around them. They continue in such position, which is then followed by dancing for up to an hour before copulation, during which the male snake lines up with the female and holds her in place by wrapping his tail around hers and grasping her with his mouth. Then, the male  everts one of his hemipenes into the female's cloaca. The mating process lasts from a few minutes to a few hours.

After copulation, Elaphe spp. seek an appropriate place to lay the developing eggs.  They usually lay eggs in the soft heart of a rotten log or in sandy soil under a rock. A good place for laying eggs is one that is damp but not wet, and warm but not hot. After laying eggs, the female snake covers them up with sand or soil, and then she leaves. A few species remain with the eggs until they hatch about 9 weeks later.

Oviparous E. obsoleta lays 12–20 eggs under logs or leaves in late summer, which hatch in the fall. The adult snakes return to their hibernation dens in the late fall. E. guttata  breeds from March to May. The mating process is similar to E. obsoleta. E. guttata lays  10–30 eggs in late May to July. The eggs are generally not protected by the adults. After 60–65 days, the eggs hatch in July through September.

Defense mechanisms
Many species of Elaphe are known for being nonaggressive and shy. They are prone to freeze their movements when they are shocked or encountering danger. This motionless response has contributed to many road kills of Elaphe. However, some  Elaphe spp. tend to be more defensive if they are continually provoked. For example, Texas rat snakes,  Elaphe obsoleta lindheimeri, are well known as one of the most snappy and combative rat snakes. In general, their defense system  can be broken down to two levels. The first line of defense involves specific behaviors that they use to warn the intruders. One of the most common ways is by coiling their bodies and vibrating their tails, which simulates a rattle. Fox snakes, Elaphe vulpina (now considered Pantherophis vulpinus) and Elaphe gloydi (now considered Pantherophis gloydi), exemplify this type of defense mechanism; they mimic the rattling vibration of rattlesnakes when they encounter danger.
Another common way of defense is by smearing a foul-smelling musk on their predators. The musk is originated from the contents of the anal gland and the intestinal tract.
The second line of defense, generally involves striking the intruder with their teeth if they are further provoked.

Locomotion
Elaphe spp. move forward using side-to-side, serpentine movement. They use the curved ventral scales of their bodies to grab the rough ground surfaces and then push against the ground to generate a forward movement. Thus, the smoother the ground is, the harder it is for them to move across it. Many species apply similar mechanisms when climbing trees.

Predation
Adult Elaphe spp. primarily prey on rodents (i.e., mice and chipmunks), bird eggs, and young birds. Juveniles feed on small lizards, young mice, and occasionally small frogs (i.e., tree frogs). Elaphe spp. hunt by waiting motionless in a fixed position until the prey comes near enough to attack. Then, they strike the prey and bite it. They use their Jacobson's organ to track and find their prey.
Being constrictors, Elaphe spp. kill the prey by creating enormous pressure on the prey's chest. As they continue to coil more tightly, the pressure on the chest prevents the blood from circulating into the heart, which eventually leads to heart failure.
They usually bite the prey first to maintain their grip on the prey before they start this deadly mechanism. In addition, they do not chew their food, but swallow it whole.

Habitat and distribution
Elaphe spp. live in a great variety of environments, depending on species and subspecies. Most are terrestrial or semiarboreal, but some burrow in sand or loose soil. 
The genus formerly contained species found on every continent except Antarctica. Taxonomic revisions have renamed most of these former Elaphe, leaving only 10 Eurasian taxa remaining in Elaphe.

Species
The following 17 species are recognized as being valid.
 Elaphe anomala (Boulenger, 1916)
 Elaphe bimaculata Schmidt, 1925
 Elaphe cantoris (Boulenger, 1894)
 Elaphe carinata (Günther, 1864)
 Elaphe climacophora (H. Boie, 1826)
 Elaphe davidi (Sauvage, 1884)
 Elaphe dione (Pallas, 1773)
 Elaphe hodgsoni (Günther, 1860)
 Elaphe moellendorffi (Boettger, 1886)
 Elaphe quadrivirgata (H. Boie, 1826)
 Elaphe quatuorlineata (Bonnaterre, 1790)
 Elaphe sauromates (Pallas, 1811)
 Elaphe schrenckii Strauch, 1873
 Elaphe taeniura (Cope, 1861)
 Elaphe urartica Jablonski, Kukushkin, Avcı, Bunyatova, Ilgaz, Tuniyev & Jandzik, 2019
 Elaphe xiphodonta Qi, Shi, Ma, Gao, Bu, Grismer, Li & Wang, 2021
 Elaphe zoigeensis Huang, Ding, Burbrink, Yang, Huang, Ling, Chen & Zhang, 2012

References

External links

 

 
Snake genera
Taxa named by Johann Georg Wagler